Stephanopodium is a genus of plant in family Dichapetalaceae.

Species include:

 Stephanopodium longipedicellatum Prance
 Stephanopodium magnifolium Prance

References

 
Taxonomy articles created by Polbot